Aspidella is also a homonym for the mushroom genus Saproamanita.

Aspidella is an Ediacaran disk-shaped fossil of uncertain affinity. It is known from the single species A. terranovica.

Morphology 

Aspidella consists of disk-shaped fossils, with concentric rings and/or centripetal rays. The diameter of circular Aspidella varies from 1 to 180 mm. Most individuals are between 4 and 10 mm, but smaller individuals would presumably have decayed before they could fossilize. Other Aspidella take the form of ellipses, 3–8 cm long and 1–4 cm wide. Most have a central pimple. The rim of all specimens is made up by ridge-edged rays and/or concentric rings.

Ecology 

The rarity of large individuals probably indicates that Aspidella were r-strategists, producing numerous offspring of which most died young. It is most common in deep-water sediments, but is a constituent of most Ediacaran fossil assemblages, including those deposited above storm wave-base. The organisms can reach densities of 3000 m−2.

Affinity 

Just like Ediacaria (see also below), Aspidella has initially been considered a scyphozoan jellyfish. This initial designation has been refuted; some specimens have been shown to be the holdfast of some organism, the main body of which extended into the open water but broke off before fossilization (a few specimens bearing stubs of stalks opposed to the central pimple support this); whereas others represent microbial colonies.

Some individuals are associated with movement trails resembling those produced by modern sea anemones (Cnidaria).

Taphonomy 
The upper and lower surfaces of the fossils have a distinct elemental composition that resembles that of fossilized biofilms. The sediment within the fossils also has a distinct composition, being enriched in certain elements with respect to the rock matrix. Since it is difficult to account for such a distribution of elements by post-mortem diagenetic processes, it would appear that the elements (and thus the sediment) were incorporated into the organism whilst it was alive.

History of research 

Aspidella terranovica was first discovered in 1868 by Scottish geologist Alexander Murray. In 1872, Elkanah Billings described Aspidella terranovica fossils from Duckworth Street, St. John's, Newfoundland. They are preserved in a Neoproterozoic outcrop of black shale. Billings was the head paleontologist with the Geological Survey of Canada at the time. Even so, his findings were questioned by Charles Doolittle Walcott, who quoted opinion that the shapes in the rocks were concretions formed inorganically. Other explanations offered at the time were that the circles were gas escape bubbles, or fakes planted by God to lure those with little faith into error. They were the first Ediacaran (Vendian) fossils described by a scientist.

For decades, Aspidella and its partner fossils were not considered to be Precambrian life forms. This lasted until the work of Reg Sprigg, who discovered the Ediacara Hills fossils. Fossils were found in many other parts of the world in rocks of about the same age and became accepted as genuine remains of life forms.

Systematics and taxonomy

Aspidella is derived from the Latin diminutive of Ancient Greek aspis (Ασπις, a round shield), and terranovica is Latin for "from the new land" (i.e. Newfoundland).

Different morphological forms have been called Ediacaria or Spriggia. However, the differences between the small elliptical "typical" Aspidella, the flat, ringed Spriggia wadea and the large, pimpled, and rayed Ediacaria seem to be due to different taphonomic conditions. For example, Spriggia and Ediacaria appear to be remains of the same animals, only that the former was fossilized in more compact, fine-grained clay, whereas the latter is known from rocks that originally were predominantly sandy sediment.

Numerous other taxa may also be junior synonyms of Aspidella:
Beltanella
Cyclomedusa
Eoporpita
Glaessneria
Irridinitus
Jampolium
Madigania
Medusinites
Paliella
Paramedusium
Planomedusites
Ediacaria
Tateana
Tirasiana
Vendella

Due to its nondescript nature, Aspidella might be considered a form taxon, an artificial assemblage of similar-looking and similar-living organisms without a phylogenetic relationship. In this case, some presumed synonyms (such as Ediacaria or Cyclomedusa) would remain valid. The type specimens were of the ellipsoid type (they are lost, but a cast remains). Thus, if Aspidella in the loose sense turns out to be an assemblage of more or less related taxa, the genus name would apply only to the smallish ellipsoid specimens. Regardless of its ultimate classification, because it has been classified as either an animal, or a plant (alga), or a fungus (lichen), the name Aspidella is covered by both Codes of Nomenclature, and this prevents adoption of a later homonym "Aspidella" (Gilbert 1940) for a group of extant mushrooms, now renamed Saproamanita.

Occurrence 

Other locations where Aspidella specimens are reported include the Bonavista Peninsula and Mistaken Point in Newfoundland, the Twitya Formation in British Columbia, and central North Carolina.

See also
 List of Ediacaran genera

References

External links

Ediacaran life
Incertae sedis
Ediacaran Canada
Taxa named by Elkanah Billings